Stefano Satta Flores (14 January 1937 – 22 October 1985) was an Italian actor and voice actor.

Biography
Born in Naples, Italy, Satta Flores graduated from the Centro Sperimentale di Cinematografia in the Italian capital city of Rome. He began acting in amateur dramatics at the Piccolo Teatro, where he acted in Shakespeare and Sbragia plays. He made his cinema debut in the film The Lizards (I basilischi), premiered by filmmaker Lina Wertmüller in 1963.

In 1971, Satta Flores appeared in the film Four Flies on Grey Velvet but did not really establish himself in cinema until 1974, when he appeared in Ettore Scola's film We All Loved Each Other So Much where he shared leading roles with Stefania Sandrelli, Vittorio Gassman, Nino Manfredi, Aldo Fabrizi and Giovanna Ralli.

Satta Flores also appeared in the 1973 films The Funny Face of the Godfather and Teresa the Thief. His last film appearance before his death was in One Hundred Days in Palermo. He was best known for playing a variety of roles in more than 60 films. He was also a voice dubber. His role as the smuggler and rakish hero Han Solo (portrayed by Harrison Ford) in the Italian dub of the Star Wars original trilogy was instrumental in establishing the importance of star power in Italian voice acting. He also used his voice talents in Alien, as the fearless Captain Dallas, as well as in 10, as the romantically-obsessed songwriter George Webber.

An eloquent spokesman on artistic and social issues of the day, he also was a respected playwright and occasionally acted in television programs. A political commitment, he founded the company I compagni di scena (The Companions of the Scene) with which he devoted himself to research work on alternative tests.

Death
Satta Flores died in Rome on 22 October 1985 at the age of 48,  following complications from leukemia treatment. In the Italian version of Star Wars: The Force Awakens, the voice of Han Solo was passed on to Harrison Ford's regular Italian dub actor Michele Gammino.

Filmography

Cinema

Ginepro fatto uomo (1962)
I basilischi (1963) - Francesco
I mostri (1963)
Gli arcangeli (1963)
Questa volta parliamo di uomini (1965) - Don Fulgencio (segment "Un brav'uomo")
The Birds, the Bees and the Italians (1966)
The Girl with the Pistol (1968) - Waiter
Io non scappo... fuggo (1970)
Mafia Connection (1970) - Sicario
La califfa (1970) - Un operaio
Four Flies on Grey Velvet (1971) - Andrea
Il generale dorme in piedi (1972) - Ten. Sogliano
The Funny Face of the Godfather (1972) - Jimmy Salvozzo
Teresa the Thief (1973) - Ercoletto
Il gioco della verità (1974)
We All Loved Each Other So Much (1974) - Nicola Palumbo
Paolo Barca, Schoolteacher and Weekend Nudist (1974) - Direttore
How Wonderful to Die Assassinated (1975) - Carlo Pisacane
Colpita da improvviso benessere (1976) - Gigino Mancuso
Salon Kitty (1976) - Dino
And Agnes Chose to Die (1976) - Il comandante
Perdutamente tuo... mi firmo Macaluso Carmelo fu Giuseppe (1976) - Carmelo Macaluso
A Spiral of Mist (1977) - Renato Marinoni
Il prefetto di ferro (1977) - Magg. Spano
Una donna di seconda mano (1977) - Sergio - il camionista
L'arma (1978) - Luigi Compagna
Who Is Killing the Great Chefs of Europe? (1978) - Fausto Zoppi
Child of the Night (1978) - Andrea, le mari
Corleone (1978) - Avvocato Natale Calia
Tanto va la gatta al lardo... (1978) - Fan from Naples
Ridendo e scherzando (1978) - Michele Sintona
Riavanti... Marsch! (1979) - Alessio
Hypochondriac (1979) - Orlando Mascarelli
The Terrace (1980) - Tizzo
One Hundred Days in Palermo (1984) - Captain Fontana (final film role)

Dubbing roles

Live action
Han Solo in Star Wars: Episode IV – A New Hope
Han Solo in Star Wars: Episode V – The Empire Strikes Back
Han Solo in Star Wars: Episode VI – Return of the Jedi
Dallas in Alien
George Webber in 10
Tommy Lillard in The Frisco Kid
H. G. Wells in Time After Time
Tripper Harrison in Meatballs
Hank Stamper in Sometimes a Great Notion
Fred Mancuso in Lady Liberty
Christopher Columbus in Christopher Columbus

References

Bibliography
Italian cinema and modern European literatures, 1945-2000 – Carlo Testa. Publisher: Greenwood Publishing Group Incorporated, 2000. Format: Hardcover, 288pp. Language: English. 
The Motion Picture Guide 1986 Annual: The Films of 1985 – Jay Robert Nash, Stanley Ralph Ross. Publisher: CineBooks, 1987. Format: Hardcover, 450pp. Language: English.

External links

La Storia di Napoli - Biography

1937 births
1985 deaths
Male actors from Naples
Centro Sperimentale di Cinematografia alumni
Italian male film actors
Italian male voice actors
Italian male television actors
Italian male dramatists and playwrights
20th-century Italian male actors
20th-century Italian dramatists and playwrights
Deaths from cancer in Lazio
Deaths from leukemia
20th-century Italian male writers